Keatinge is a surname. Notable people with the surname include: 

Cadogan Keatinge, Anglican priest in Ireland 
Edgar Keatinge (1905–1998), English farmer, soldier and Conservative Party politician
Joe Keatinge, American comic book writer and editor
John Keatinge (1769–1817), Irish Anglican priest
Maurice Keatinge (c.1761–1835), Irish landowner, soldier and politician
Paffard Keatinge-Clay (born 1926), English architect
Richard Harte Keatinge (1825–1904), Irish Lieutenant General and Victoria Cross recipient
William Keatinge (1869–1934), English Catholic prelate